= Janetstown =

Janetstown may refer to:

- Janetstown (near Thurso), a village in Highland, Scotland
- Janetstown, Wick, a district of the town of Wick, Highland, Scotland
